The Trabant 1.1 is the fourth and final series production model of the East German Trabant series, made by VEB Sachsenring Automobilwerke Zwickau. Unlike its predecessors, which have a two-stroke engine, the Trabant 1.1 has a four-stroke Otto engine. In total, 39,474 units of the Trabant 1.1 were made from May 1990 to 30 April 1991, which makes it the rarest Trabant model.

Most Trabant 1.1 were exported to Poland and Hungary. In Germany, it did not sell very well; in 1990, the 1.1 saloon was offered at a price of DM 10,887, which, at the time, was considered overpriced.

Technical description 
The Trabant 1.1 is a small compact car that uses the front-engine, front-wheel-drive layout. It was made in limousine, universal, and tramp body styles. The limousine is a two-door saloon, the universal a three-door estate, and the tramp is a doorless ATV off-road-like vehicle with a canvas roof.

Like its predecessors, the 1.1 has a self-supporting body with a steel frame, and body parts made of duroplast. In front, the Trabant has independent suspension with MacPherson struts and triangular control arms; in rear, it has independent suspension with coil springs mated with hydraulic shock absorbers and diagonal control arms. The braking system is a dual-circuit hydraulic system with disc brakes on the front, and drums on the rear wheels. A rack-and-pinion system is used for steering. The wheelsize is 13 in (330 mm).

The Trabant is powered by a carburetted, water-cooled, Barkas B820 four-cylinder, OHC, Otto engine (a version of the VW EA 111 engine produced under licence). This engine displaces 1.1 litres and is rated 30 kW; it produces a maximum torque of 72.6 N·m. The torque is transmitted from the engine to the front wheels with a dry single-disc clutch and a manual four-speed gearbox. Unlike the Trabant 601, the 1.1 does not have a column mounted gear shifter, instead, it uses a floormounted gearshift lever on the right-hand side of the driver's seat.

The fuel consumption is rated 8 L/100 km, the top speed 125 km/h, and the acceleration from 0–100 km/h is said to be 22 s.

Gallery

References

External links

Cars of Germany
Cars introduced in 1990
Economy of East Germany
1990s cars
Front-wheel-drive vehicles
Cars discontinued in 1991